The European Network of Science Centres and Museums (ECSITE), is a not-for-profit organisation initiated in 1989.

In 1991, it was formed under Belgian jurisdiction to facilitate communication and cooperation among Science Centres and Museums in Europe.

ECSITE is linking science engagement professionals of over 400 institutions in 50 countries for projects, activities and to facilitates the exchange of ideas and best practice on current science issues.

While many countries have national networks consistent of science centres, international networks like Ecsite, provide through their annual network conference science centre personnel to gather, share expertise, and discuss key issues.

Sister networks focusing similarly on science engagement in different regional context and gather science engagement professionals are:

 Association of Science and Technology Centers (ASTC)
 Asia Pacific Network of Science and Technology Centres (ASPAC)
 Network for the Popularization of Science and Technology in Latin America and The Caribbean (RedPOP)
 North Africa and Middle East science centres (NAMES)
 Southern African Association of Science and Technology Centres (SAASTEC)

Projects 
Ecsite coordinates and participates in collaborative projects with its member organisations with the goal of influencing the development of science engagement. These projects can be funded by the European Commission or run as initiatives organised in partnership with other organisations. As of 2023, Ecsite is involved in 8 projects involving 23 of its member institutions.

References 

International scientific organizations
Museum associations and consortia
Organizations established in 1991
Science centers
Science museums
Technology museums